Chitprapussorn Thiansuwan née Prapussorn Panichkul, nicknamed Dang (born March 25, 1949, in Phetchaburi, Thailand) is Miss Thailand 1966.

References 

1949 births
Living people
Prapussorn Panichkul
Prapussorn Panichkul